Operation Morvarid was an operation launched by the Iranian Navy and Air Force against the Iraqi Navy sites on 27 November 1980 in response to Iraq positioning radar and monitoring equipment on the Mina Al-Bakr and Khor-al-Amaya oil rigs to counter Iranian air operations. The operation resulted in a victory for Iran, which managed to destroy both oil rigs as well as much of the Iraqi Navy and inflicted significant damage to Iraqi ports and airfields.

Background 
In late November, Iranians decided hit hard in response to the Iraqi destruction of the Abadan Refinery. They resolved to neutralize  Kohr al-Amaya and Mina al-Bakr offshore oil terminals. By doing so, they planned to draw Iraq's navy out into the open sea and allow Iran's air force and navy to tear it apart.

Battle
On 27 November 1980, after Iranian technicians prepared as many aircraft and helicopters as possible, Iranian F-4 Phantoms and F-5 Tiger IIs attacked Iraqi airfields around Basra.

During the night of 28 November, six ships of the Islamic Republic of Iran Navy's Task Force 421 deployed Iranian marines on the Iraqi oil terminals at Mina al Bakr and Khor-al-Amaya. The marines, supported by Army Aviation's AH-1J Cobras, Bell 214s and CH-47C Chinooks, eliminated most Iraqi defenders during a short firefight, then deployed a large number of bombs and mines. They were then evacuated by helicopter and left the Iraqi oil installations and early warning bases in flames.

At the same time, two Iranian Kaman-class (La Combattante IIa missile boats)  (Paykan and Joshan) blockaded the ports of Al Faw and Umm Qasr, blocking 60 foreign ships and shelling both facilities.

In response, the Iraqi Navy deployed P-6 torpedo boats and Osa II-class fast attack craft for a counter-attack. The boats engaged the two Iranian missile boats which managed to sink two Osas with Harpoon missiles. The remaining three Osa-class missile boats continued to attack the missile boat Paykan. The crew of the Paykan called IRIAF for assistance which sent two F-4s (each armed with six AGM-65 Maverick missiles). By the time they arrived, however, Paykan had been sunk after being hit by two Iraqi P-15 Termit missiles. In response, the F-4s targeted the remaining Iraqi ships and sunk three Osa IIs and four P-6s.

Soon another four Iranian F-4s arrived from Shiraz Air Base, bombed the port of Al Faw, and, together with F-5s, destroyed the surrounding Iraqi SAM sites. One Iranian F-4 was also downed while another one was hit and damaged by an Iraqi SA-7 surface-to-air missile but managed to return to base.

At this time, the Iranian F-14 Tomcat formations joined the battle and, together with several F-4s, covered the withdrawal of Task Force 421 and bombed the Iraqi oil rigs. Next, they attacked the Mina al Bakr terminal. An Iraqi Su-22 attacked Paykan, which managed to shoot it down with its 76-mm gun turret. The Iraqis scrambled four MiG-23 Floggers to defend the terminal. Shortly after, an Iranian F-14 downed one of the MiGs, forcing the others MiG-23 to flee.

Aftermath
The destruction of Iraqi SAM sites and radar and monitoring equipment made it possible for the IRIAF to attack via southern Iraq again. The Iranian missile boat Joshan which took part in this operation was later sunk during Operation Praying Mantis by U.S. Navy warships.

See also
Abbas Doran
Combat history of the F-14
Operation Kaman 99 (1980)
Attack on H3

References

External links
Operation Pearl
Operation Morvarid

Military operations of the Iran–Iraq War in 1980
Morvarid
Morvarid
Morvarid